Bethany is a town in southern Brooke County, West Virginia, United States. The population was 756 at the 2020 census. It is part of the Weirton–Steubenville metropolitan area. It is best known as the home of Bethany College, a private liberal arts college that was the first institution of higher education in what is now West Virginia.

History

Scotch-Irish minister Alexander Campbell established a post office in the are of his homestead around 1827. In 1840, he founded Bethany College, and then platted the town in 1847. The town was most likely was named after the biblical town of Bethany, where Jesus was said to have raised Lazarus of Bethany from the dead.
 
The Bethany Historic District was listed on the National Register of Historic Places in 1982. Located within the district are the separately listed Alexander Campbell Mansion, Delta Tau Delta Founders House, Old Bethany Church, Old Main, and Pendleton Heights.

Geography
Bethany is located at  (40.206423, -80.559621).

Demographics

2010 census
At the 2010 census there were 1,036 people, 174 households, and 94 families living in the town. The racial makeup of the town was 88.9% White, 7.3% African American, 0.4% Native American, 0.5% Asian, 0.7% from other races, and 2.2% from two or more races. Hispanic or Latino of any race were 2.5%.

Of the 174 households 14.9% had children under the age of 18 living with them, 47.1% were married couples living together, 6.3% had a female householder with no husband present, 0.6% had a male householder with no wife present, and 46.0% were non-families. 42.0% of households were one person and 13.2% were one person aged 65 or older. The average household size was 1.93 and the average family size was 2.64.

The median age in the town was 21.3 years. 4.6% of residents were under the age of 18; 68.1% were between the ages of 18 and 24; 9.2% were from 25 to 44; 10% were from 45 to 64; and 8% were 65 or older. The gender makeup of the town was 51.8% male and 48.2% female.

2000 census
At the 2000 census there were 985 people, 190 households, and 99 families living in the town. The population density was 1,374.4 inhabitants per square mile (528.2/km2). There were 212 housing units at an average density of 295.8 per square mile (113.7/km2).  The racial makeup of the town was 94.42% White, 3.25% African American, 0.91% Asian, 0.61% Pacific Islander, and 0.81% from two or more races. Hispanic or Latino of any race were 0.71%.

Of the 190 households 18.9% had children under the age of 18 living with them, 46.3% were married couples living together, 5.3% had a female householder with no husband present, and 47.4% were non-families. 40.0% of households were one person and 7.4% were one person aged 65 or older. The average household size was 2.11 and the average family size was 2.90.

The age distribution was 7.9% under the age of 18, 64.0% from 18 to 24, 10.4% from 25 to 44, 11.4% from 45 to 64, and 6.4% 65 or older. The median age was 21 years. For every 100 females there were 107.8 males. For every 100 females age 18 and over, there were 109.5 males.

The median household income was $36,375 and the median family income  was $61,250. Males had a median income of $36,786 versus $23,750 for females. The per capita income for the town was $10,769. About 3.9% of families and 11.1% of the population were below the poverty line, including 12.4% of those under age 18 and 3.4% of those age 65 or over.

Notable people
 Alexander Campbell, early leader of the Restoration Movement in Bethany and founder of Bethany College
Ira Rodgers, football, baseball, and basketball star at West Virginia University. Later head coach of both the football and baseball teams.

References

Towns in Brooke County, West Virginia